Miclești is a commune in Vaslui County, Western Moldavia, Romania. It is composed of three villages: Chircești, Miclești and Popești.

References

Communes in Vaslui County
Localities in Western Moldavia